Killinick railway station served the village of Killinick and the surrounding areas in County Wexford, Ireland.

The station opened on 30 August 1906 as Orristown Junction. It was renamed to Assally Junction and finally to Killinick. The station closed in 1976. Excursions had stopped by 1979.

Local Link route 387 serves Killinick village several times a day each way linking it to Wexford, Rosslare Strand and Rosslare Europort. Wexford Bus also serve the village several times each weekday on their route between Wexford and Rosslare Strand. It is also served on Fridays-only by Bus Éireann route 378 (Churchtown to Wexford).

Routes

References 

Disused railway stations in County Wexford
Railway stations opened in 1906
Railway stations closed in 1976
1906 establishments in Ireland
1976 disestablishments in Ireland
Railway stations in the Republic of Ireland opened in the 20th century